Slobodan "Slobo" Ilijevski (Cyrillic: Слободан Илијевски Слобо) (October 24, 1949 in Skopje, Yugoslavia – July 14, 2008 in Bellingham, Washington) was a Yugoslav and Macedonian football (soccer) goalkeeper who played in the North American Soccer League and Major Indoor Soccer League.

Club career
In 1977, Ilijevski moved to the United States and settled with extended family (Duško Krstovski/Detroit Vardar SC) in Detroit, Michigan.  In 1978, he signed with the Detroit Express of the North American Soccer League.  After two seasons with the Express, Ilijevski moved to the Atlanta Chiefs for one season before moving to the indoor game with the St. Louis Steamers of the Major Indoor Soccer League in the fall of 1980.  He would spend the rest of his professional career playing indoor soccer.  He played seven seasons with the Steamers and was named the 1982 and 1984 MISL Goalkeeper of the Year.  The Steamers folded after the 1987–1988 season and Ilijevski moved to the Baltimore Blast for one season before returning to St. Louis to sign with the St. Louis Storm in August 1989.  In 1992, he moved to the St. Louis Ambush of the National Professional Soccer League.  After his retirement from professional soccer, Ilijevski continued to play amateur soccer with St. Louis Kutis S.C.

Personal life
In December 1990, Ilijevski became an American citizen.

Death
On July 13, 2008, Ilijevski ruptured his aorta while playing goalkeeper for St. Louis Kutis in a game in Seattle, Washington.  He died after thirteen hours of surgery. On March 12, 2014 it was announced that he would be a 2014 inductee into the Indoor Soccer Hall of Fame.

References

External links
 NASL stats

1949 births
2008 deaths
Footballers from Skopje
Yugoslav emigrants to the United States
American people of Macedonian descent
Association football goalkeepers
Yugoslav footballers
Macedonian footballers
American soccer players
Detroit Express players
Atlanta Chiefs players
St. Louis Steamers (original MISL) players
Baltimore Blast (1980–1992) players
St. Louis Storm players
St. Louis Ambush (1992–2000) players
St. Louis Kutis players
Major Indoor Soccer League (1978–1992) players
North American Soccer League (1968–1984) players
Macedonian expatriate footballers
Yugoslav expatriate footballers
Expatriate soccer players in the United States
Sports deaths in Washington (state)
Association football players who died while playing